The 2012–13 Rio Grande Valley Flash season was the first season of the Rio Grande Valley Flash indoor soccer club. The Flash, a Central Division team in the Professional Arena Soccer League, played their home games in the State Farm Arena in Hidalgo, Texas. The team was led by owner Gerardo Guerra Lozano and head coach Mariano Bollella.

Season summary
The Flash were successful in the regular season, compiling a 12–4 record and placing second in the competitive Central Division. The team split the first half of the season with four wins and four losses before winning the final regular season matches. The team also fared well at the box office, drawing the fourth-highest average attendance for home games this season. The Flash qualified for the postseason and earned the right to play for the Ron Newman Cup in the PASL National Championship. They defeated Central Division regular season champion Dallas Sidekicks in consecutive games and advanced to the PASL Semi-Finals in San Diego where they fell to the Detroit Waza in overtime.

The Flash did not participate in the 2012–13 United States Open Cup for Arena Soccer.

Off-field moves

The team was originally organized in 2011 as the Monterrey Flash in the Liga Mexicana de Futbol Rápido Profesional (LMFR). Although successful (they won the league championship and finished second in the 2012 FIFRA Club Championship) owner Gerardo Guerra Lozano moved the team across the border to Texas and joined the PASL in September 2012. In mid-October 2012, the Flash announced that they had rejoined the LMFR and would participate in both leagues.

The team's initial logo matched the one used in Monterrey, with only the location named updated. On January 9, 2013, the Flash unveiled a new, sleeker logo during a press conference at Ford Arena.

The Flash held several pre-season promotion events including a friendly match against local media on November 14 and a "Student's Day" for local area schools during their November 15 match against the Texas South Devils of the National Premier Soccer League.

Roster moves
On January 9, 2013, the team announced that it had signed a number of "soccer stars from Mexico" to play for the Flash during home games. The first such announced signing was Claudio "Diablo" Nuñez, formerly of the Tigres UANL. At the same press conference, the Flash announced the signing of goalkeeper Juan Gamboa, a Brownsville, Texas, native who played for The University of Texas at Brownsville.

On January 31, 2013, the team announced the signing of Hector Nicanor. The veteran defender played for C.F. Monterrey and Monarcas Morelia in the Mexican Primera División of Liga MX in the mid-1990s.

Awards and honors
In postseason honors, defender Damian Garcia was named to the 2012-13 PASL All-League Second Team.

Schedule

Pre-season

Regular season

♥ Replacement squad after Phoenix franchise revoked by league.

Postseason

References

External links
rgvflash.com Rio Grande Valley Flash official website

Rio Grande Valley Flash
Sports in the Rio Grande Valley
Rio Grande Valley Flash 2012
Rio Grande Valley Flash 2012
Hidalgo La Fiera